Michiel Driessen (born 13 August 1959) is a Dutch fencer. He competed in the individual and team épée events at the 1988 Summer Olympics.

References

External links
 

1959 births
Living people
Dutch male fencers
Olympic fencers of the Netherlands
Fencers at the 1988 Summer Olympics
Fencers from Amsterdam
20th-century Dutch people